The following is a list of the 24 communes of the Réunion (an overseas department of France), along with the arrondissement (district) in which they are located, and the intercommunality of which they are a member.

Intercommunalities:
 CASUD: Communauté d'agglomération du Sud, created in 2010.
 CINOR: Communauté intercommunale du Nord de La Réunion, created in 2001.
 CIREST: Communauté intercommunale Réunion Est, created in 2002.
 CIVIS: Communauté intercommunale des Villes solidaires, created in 2003.
 TCO: Territoire de la Côte Ouest, created in 2002.

See also
 List of cities in East Africa

References

External links 
 Administrative map of Réunion

Reunion
 
Reunion 3